Two British ships have been named Sir Sidney Smith (or Sidney Smith, or Sir Sydney Smith) , after Admiral Sidney Smith:

 , a British merchant vessel launched in 1793, taken over by the Royal Navy and renamed Sir Sidney Smith (alternatively spelled Sir Sydney Smith)  in 1813 during the War of 1812
 ,  was a French vessel taken in prize in 1799. She served the Royal Navy for two years during the French Revolutionary Wars as a hired armed schooner. She then became a merchantman, sailing to the Mediterranean, the Baltic, and the West Indies. She was last listed in 1814.
 , was a British merchantman launched 1802 in Dover and captured in 1812
 Sir Sidney Smith, of 114 tons (bm),  was launched at Cowes in 1807. She was a West Indiaman. She sank on 28 February 1810 at Port Royal, Jamaica after having arrived in a leaky state.

Citations

Royal Navy ship names